Sigrun Eng (born 5 June 1951 in Sør-Fron) is a Norwegian politician who belongs to the Labour Party.

She was elected to the Norwegian Parliament from Buskerud in 1993, and has been re-elected on three occasions. She previously served as a deputy representative during the 1989-1993 term.

On the local level Eng was a member of Gol municipal council from 1983 to 1991. She has chaired the local party chapter since 1988.

References

1951 births
Living people
People from Sør-Fron
People from Gol, Norway
Members of the Storting
Buskerud politicians
Labour Party (Norway) politicians
Women members of the Storting
21st-century Norwegian politicians
21st-century Norwegian women politicians
20th-century Norwegian politicians
20th-century Norwegian women politicians